List of champions of the 1892 U.S. National Championships (now known as the US Open). The men's tournament was held from 23 August to 30 August on the outdoor grass courts at the Newport Casino in Newport, Rhode Island. The women's tournament was held from 21 June to 25 June on the outdoor grass courts at the Philadelphia Cricket Club in Philadelphia, Pennsylvania. This tournament saw the introduction of the U.S. National Mixed Doubles Championship which was played, like the women's singles and women's doubles competition, at the Philadelphia Cricket Club. It was the 12th U.S. National Championships and the second Grand Slam tournament of the year.

Finals

Men's singles

 Oliver Campbell defeated  Fred Hovey  7–5, 3–6, 6–3, 7–5

Women's singles

 Mabel Cahill defeated  Elisabeth Moore  5–7, 6–3, 6–4, 4–6, 6–2

Men's doubles
 Oliver Campbell /  Bob Huntington defeated  Valentine Hall /  Edward Hall 6–4, 6–2, 4–6, 6–3

Women's doubles
 Mabel Cahill /  Adeline McKinlay defeated  Helen Day Harris /  Amy Williams 6–1, 6–3

Mixed doubles
 Mabel Cahill /  Clarence Hobart defeated  Elisabeth Moore /  Rodmond V. Beach 6–3, 6–4

References

External links
Official US Open website

 
U.S. National Championships
U.S. National Championships (tennis) by year
1892 in sports in Rhode Island
1892 in sports in Pennsylvania
June 1892 sports events
August 1892 sports events